Jacques Crevoisier (24 November 1947 – 16 May 2020) was a French footballer and coach.

Biography
Crevoisier held a doctorate in psychology. He played for AS Baume-les-Dames in Championnat National from 1973 to 1977, winning a Coupe de Franche-Comté in 1974. After his playing career, Crevoisier was a coordinator for FC Sochaux-Montbéliard, a coach for Liverpool F.C. from 2001 to 2003, and a sports consultant for Canal+, where he was also a commentator for Premier League matches. He worked radio broadcasts for RMC and contributed to the So Foot website. He was also an advisor to FIFA and UEFA.

Jacques Crevoisier died on 16 May 2020 in Divonne-les-Bains at the age of 72 due to a heart attack.

Honours
Liverpool FC
 League Cup: 2003

Publications
Entraîneur : compétence et passion (2000)
Mémo urgences (2003)

References

1947 births
2020 deaths
French footballers
Racing Besançon players
Liverpool F.C. non-playing staff
Association footballers not categorized by position